David Boyd (7 November 1870 – 1909) was a Scottish footballer who played in the Football League for Preston North End.

References

1870 births
1909 deaths
Scottish footballers
English Football League players
Scottish Football League players
Association football forwards
Troon F.C. players
Abercorn F.C. players
Rangers F.C. players
Preston North End F.C. players
Third Lanark A.C. players
Linfield F.C. players
People from Troon
Footballers from South Ayrshire